The 2023 PEI Scotties Tournament of Hearts Women's Championship, the women's provincial curling championship for Prince Edward Island, was held from January 26 to 28 at the Crapaud Community Curling Club in Crapaud, Prince Edward Island. The winning Suzanne Birt rink represented Prince Edward Island at the 2023 Scotties Tournament of Hearts in Kamloops, British Columbia, and finished seventh in Pool A with a 2–6 record. The event was held in conjunction with the 2023 PEI Tankard, the provincial men's championship.

This is the first time since 2021 that the event will be held due to the COVID-19 pandemic in Canada.

Teams
The teams are listed as follows:

Knockout Brackets

Source:

A Event

B Event

C Event

Knockout Results
All draw times are listed in Atlantic Time (UTC−04:00).

Draw 4
Thursday, January 26, 9:00 am

Draw 6
Thursday, January 26, 7:00 pm

Draw 7
Friday, January 27, 9:00 am

Draw 9
Friday, January 27, 7:00 pm

Draw 11
Saturday, January 28, 2:00 pm

Draw 12
Saturday, January 28, 7:00 pm

Playoffs

No playoffs were required as the Suzanne Birt rink won all three qualifying events.

References

External links

Prince Edward Island
Curling competitions in Prince Edward Island
January 2023 sports events in Canada
2023 in Prince Edward Island
Queens County, Prince Edward Island